Géraldine Frey (born 19 June 1997) is a Swiss track and field athlete. In 2022, she became the Swiss national champion over 200 metres.

Career 
Frey won the 2022 Swiss National
Championships over 200 metres, at the Letzigrund in Zurich. In doing so, Frey ran a new personal best time of 23.12 seconds. Frey was part of the Swiss relay team that finished seventh at the 2022 World Athletics Championships in the 4 x 100 m relay final.

References

External Links

1997 births
Living people
Swiss female sprinters
20th-century Swiss women
21st-century Swiss women